Des Moines Daily News was a daily newspaper published in Des Moines, Iowa between 1881 and 1908.

Notable people
 Ella Hamilton Durley (died 1922), reporter and editorial and special writer

References

Defunct newspapers published in Iowa
Publications disestablished in 1908
Publications established in 1881